Hermann Oswald is a German tenor in opera and concert.

Oswald received his first musical training as a member of the Tölzer Knabenchor. Among his operatic roles were Monostatos in Mozart’s Zauberflöte under Achim Freyer in Schwetzingen and Strasbourg and Monteverdi's L'Orfeo under Ivor Bolton at the Bavarian State Opera. In 1997–98 he performed with the Bach Kantorei, singing Handel’s Messiah. He recorded Bach's Mass in B minor with Thomas Hengelbrock.

References

External links 
 
 Hermann Oswald Carus-Verlag
 Bavarian tenor Hermann Oswald to perform in Montreal on the occasion of the 25th anniversary of Ensemble Caprice baviere-quebec.org

German operatic tenors
Living people
Bach singers
Year of birth missing (living people)